The  is an inactive professional wrestling championship in the Japanese promotion DDT Pro-Wrestling. The title was established in 2005 when Takao Omori defeated Danshoku Dino on the first day of the Pro Wrestling Zero1-Max Survivor 72H tour to win the title.

Title history

Combined reigns

Footnotes

See also

DDT Pro-Wrestling
Professional wrestling in Japan

References

DDT Pro-Wrestling championships